The Croatian Ice Hockey League is the top ice hockey league in Croatia. The league is operated by the Croatian Ice Hockey Federation.

History
The league was formed in 1991 with the dissolution of Yugoslavia. Until then, Croatian teams played in the Yugoslav Ice Hockey League. The hockey teams Mladost and Medveščak were playing in the first division, while Sisak and Zagreb were playing in the second division of the Yugoslav league. The former two were much stronger, but as financing went away their best players did not stay with the clubs. This resulted in a more balanced competition, in which KHL Zagreb went on to win three times in a row. Medveščak however managed to remerge as the country's dominant team, as it won the competition for eleven straight seasons.

Due to the very short duration of the season, Croatian teams often play in other leagues, such as the Slohokej League, Erste Bank Eishockey Liga and the now defunct Interliga and Panonian League. Recently, the league expanded to five teams with the addition of KHL Munje from Zagreb.

Teams

Champions

External links
 

Croatian Ice Hockey League
Top tier ice hockey leagues in Europe
1